The Star-Clipper-Canfield Building and Winding Stairway are located in Traer, Iowa, United States.  The staircase is thought to be one of a kind in the country, and it was featured on a U.S. commemorative stamp. The exterior winding staircase was designed by E.E. Taylor of Burlington, Iowa, and built by the Burlington Iron Works.  The staircase was built outside because there was no room for one inside of the buildings.  The Canfield Building, to which it is attached, was built the same year.  The Star-Clipper Building was completed in 1888.  The complex served as a newspaper office until 1953 when it was converted into commercial use.  It was listed on the National Register of Historic Places in 1975.

References

Commercial buildings completed in 1888
Commercial buildings completed in 1894
Stairways in the United States
Buildings and structures in Tama County, Iowa
Commercial buildings on the National Register of Historic Places in Iowa
National Register of Historic Places in Tama County, Iowa
Stairways on the National Register of Historic Places
Transportation buildings and structures on the National Register of Historic Places in Iowa
1894 establishments in Iowa